Sun Hing Garden is a Home Ownership Scheme and Private Sector Participation Scheme court built on reclaimed land of Tai Po Hoi in Tai Po, New Territories, Hong Kong near Fu Shin Estate, Chung Nga Court, Ming Nga Court, New Territories North Regional Police Headquarters and Fu Shin Sports Centre. It has a total of five residential blocks built in 1986.

Houses

Demographics
According to the 2016 by-census, Sun Hing Garden had a population of 4,303. The median age was 42.9 and the majority of residents (96.5 per cent) were of Chinese ethnicity. The average household size was 3 people. The median monthly household income of all households (i.e. including both economically active and inactive households) was HK$36,430.

Politics
Sun Hing Garden is located in Fu Ming Sun constituency of the Tai Po District Council. It was formerly represented by Kwan Wing-yip, who was elected in the 2019 elections until July 2021.

See also

Public housing estates in Tai Po

References

Tai Po
Residential buildings completed in 1986
Home Ownership Scheme
Private Sector Participation Scheme
Housing estates with centralized LPG system in Hong Kong